Lapseki District is a district of the Çanakkale Province of Turkey. Its seat is the town of Lapseki. Its area is 821 km2, and its population is 28,742 (2021).

Composition
There are three municipalities in Lapseki District:
 Çardak
 Lapseki
 Umurbey

There are 40 villages in Lapseki District:

 Adatepe
 Akçaalan
 Alpagut
 Balcılar
 Beybaş
 Beyçayırı
 Beypınarı
 Çamyurt
 Çataltepe
 Çavuşköy
 Dereköy
 Dişbudak
 Doğandere
 Dumanlı
 Ecialan
 Gökköy
 Güreci
 Hacıgelen
 Hacıömerler
 Harmancık
 İlyasköy
 Kangırlı
 Karamusalar
 Karaömerler
 Kemiklialan
 Kırcalar
 Kızıldam
 Kocabaşlar
 Kocaveli
 Mecidiye
 Nusretiye
 Sındal
 Subaşı
 Suluca
 Şahinli
 Şevketiye
 Taştepe
 Üçpınar
 Yaylalar
 Yenice

References

Districts of Çanakkale Province